Alison Hester is an ecologist in the UK, she is Professor at the James Hutton Institute in Dundee, Scotland and is an expert in the effects of land management on biodiversity.

Education and career 
Hester was educated at King's College London, she then did a PhD at the University of Aberdeen and was a Royal Society Postdoctoral Fellow at CSIRO Western Australia.

Her research looks at natural resource management and effects on biodiversity; her work has raised awareness of issues affecting woodland such as habitat fragmentation and invasive species such as bracken, and has shown that it is important to consider cultural context in land management for example the management of moorland for grouse shooting.

Books 
Chapter 5 Threatened Habitats: Marginal Vegetation in Upland Areas, with Rob Brooker, in Biodiversity Under Threat, edited by R E Hester, R M Harrison, published by the Royal Society of Chemistry in 2007.

Chapter 9 Plant traits, Browsing and Grazing Herbivores, and Vegetation Dynamics, with Christina Skarpe, in The Ecology of Browsing and Grazing, edited by Gordon, Iain J., Prins, Herbert H.T., published by Springer in 2008.

Awards and honours 

 Gave the British Ecological Society's '12 Months in Ecology' plenary lecture at their 2016 Annual Meeting
 Recognised by Visit Aberdeenshire for bringing an academic conference to North East Scotland thus supporting the local economy.
 Awarded an Honorary Fellowship of the Royal Scottish Geographical Society in 2019.
 Chair of the Natural Capital Initiative.
 Fellow of the Royal Society of Biology.

References

External links 
James Hutton Institute profile

Alumni of King's College London
Alumni of the University of Aberdeen
Living people
Women ecologists
British ecologists
21st-century British women scientists
20th-century British women scientists
Fellows of the Royal Society of Biology
Year of birth missing (living people)